Nupserha brachytrita is a species of beetle in the family Cerambycidae. It was described by Per Olof Christopher Aurivillius in 1914.

Varietas
 Nupserha brachytrita var. vitticeps Breuning, 1950
 Nupserha brachytrita var. fuscoreducta Breuning, 1953

References

brachytrita
Beetles described in 1914